A wicking bed is an agricultural  irrigation system used in arid countries where water is scarce, devised by Australian inventor Colin Austin. It can be used both in (arid) fields as in containers. Besides use in fields/containers outdoors, it can also be used indoors (i.e. greenhouse).

The system is designed to increase food production while using approximately 50% less water than traditional irrigation, by utilizing underground water reservoirs filled with decomposing organic matter and the process of evaporation.

Despite being an irrigation system (which can even be fitted with automated refill capability via rainwater tank and float-valve), it still remains relatively low-tech.

There are a number of commercially available wicking bed products including re-cycled plastic wicking "cells" that are reported to reduce water use by up to 80% when compared to above ground irrigation

Advantages 
There are a number of benefits to wicking beds, many of which arise due from the water moving upwards from below:

Water Efficiency 
Watering from below produces less evaporation than top watered methods.  Significant water savings are generated given the moisture gradient is the reverse of that from watering methods.

Deeper Roots 
Plant roots seek out moisture. Deep watering is often recommended for this reason. Wicking beds have a moisture gradient that encourages roots downwards. This gives more stable plants that are healthier and less prone to water stress when surfaces dry out

Lower Fungal Disease 
The surface of a correctly constructed wicking bed is generally dry unless it has been raining. This means a lower level of surface fungal issues. This particularly benefits vegetables prone to fungal infections, such as cucumber, tomato and squash varieties

Surface Pest Control 
Slugs, snails and other molluscs much prefer a moist surface. They find wicking beds more challenging to establish in and move between plants.

Nutrient Retention 
Soluble fertilisers often wash through soil into the water table. However in a wicking bed, these are retained in the reservoir to be wicked back up through the soil. This means less fertiliser needed.

Disadvantages

Deep Rooted / Invasive Plants 
Water will only wick up 300-400mm in potting mix. This is great for vegetables and other relatively shallow rooted plants, but not suitable for deeper root stock. Shrubs, trees, or anything with an invasive root structure may not benefit from being grown in a wicking bed.

Salinity 
There can be a build up of salt in a wicking bed. It is important they are flushed from time to time. Well constructed beds with a good drain typically get flushed, or at least diluted in heavy rain so this is not usually an issue. However in a long term drought, it is important to flush through the water from time to time.

Anaerobic decomposition 
It is important to build in an air gap in a wicking bed, between the water and the soil, with only 5-10% of the area crossing that boundary for wicking. This stops the soil getting too sodden, and helps prevent an odorous anaerobic decomposition from occurring. A badly constructed wicking bed may even have organic matter sitting in the reservoir layer below the water line, which can trigger the same thing. Use of charcoal in the lower areas of the mix is recommended to keep the dam soil sweet.

Cost/Effort 
There's no doubt it costs more up front to establish a wicking bed. However the effort is generally returned in higher yields, and much lower maintenance.

References

External links
 http://www.wickingbeds.com.au
http://www.waterups.com.au
 http://www.urbanfoodgarden.org/main/wicking-beds/wicking-beds.htm
 http://www.sgaonline.org.au/wicking-beds/
 http://www.wickingbed.com/
 https://www.youtube.com/watch?v=1PlBrOnKaQI
https://www.urbanveggiecrew.com.au/high-yields

Irrigation